Chugan (also Romanized as Chūgān; also known as Gaugān and Gowgān) is a village in Arabkhaneh Rural District, Shusef District, Nehbandan County, South Khorasan Province, Iran. At the 2006 census, its population was 17, in 5 families.

References 

Populated places in Nehbandan County